Berdnikov is a Russian masculine surname, its feminine counterpart is Berdnikova. It may refer to:

Aleksei Berdnikov (born 1996), Russian football player
Alexander Berdnikov (born 1953), Russian politician
Roman Berdnikov, general
Roman Berdnikov (born 1992), Russian ice hockey player
Sergei Berdnikov (born 1971), Russian ice hockey left winger
Vadim Berdnikov (born 1987), Russian ice hockey player 
Vladimir Berdnikov (born 1946), Russian painter and glass artist

Russian-language surnames